Hazen may refer to:

 Hazen (name)
 Hazen High School (disambiguation), various high schools
 Hazen Street, an American pop punk group
 Hazen-Williams equation, a pressure loss formula
 Hazen unit, a unit of measurement for the discolouration of water
 a 6-row feed barley variety

Places 
 Lake Hazen, the northernmost lake of Canada
 Hazenland, an island in Greenland

United States 
 Hazen, Arkansas, a city in Prairie County
 Hazen, Nevada, an unincorporated community in Churchill County
 Hazen, North Dakota, a city in Mercer County
 Hazen, Beaver County, Pennsylvania, a census-designated place
 Hazen, Jefferson County, Pennsylvania, an unincorporated community
 Hazen Bay, a bay of the Bering Sea, Alaska

See also
 Czech handball (národní házená in Czech), an outdoor ball game